The 1841 Connecticut gubernatorial election was held on April 5, 1841. Incumbent governor and Whig nominee William W. Ellsworth was re-elected, defeating businessman and Democratic nominee Francis H. Nicoll with 55.79% of the vote.

This was the largest percentage of the vote achieved by the Whig Party in a Connecticut election for governor.

Nicoll had made his fortune in New York City, and moved back to his home town of Stafford some time before 1841. He died on September 27, 1842, at the age of 57.

General election

Candidates
Major party candidates

William W. Ellsworth, Whig
Francis H. Nicoll, Democratic

Results

References

1841
Connecticut
Gubernatorial